Sri Paramakalyani College, is a general degree college located in Alwarkurichi, Tenkasi District, Tamil Nadu. It was established in the year 1963. The college is affiliated with Manonmaniam Sundaranar University. This college offers different courses in arts, commerce and science.

Departments

Science
Mathematics 
Chemistry
Physics 
Microbiology
Biotechnology
Zoology
Information Technology
Electronics and communication

Arts and Commerce
Tamil
English
Commerce

Accreditation
The college is  recognized by the University Grants Commission (UGC).

References

External links
http://www.spkcazk.com

Educational institutions established in 1963
1963 establishments in Madras State
Colleges affiliated to Manonmaniam Sundaranar University
Universities and colleges in Tirunelveli district